The 2021 Tyrone Senior Football Championship was the 116th edition of Tyrone GAA's premier Gaelic football tournament for senior clubs in County Tyrone, Northern Ireland. The championship consisted of 18 teams and had a straight knock-out format. The winners receive the O'Neill Cup and represent Tyrone in the Ulster Senior Club Football Championship. The draw for the championship was made on 15 July 2021.

Dungannon Thomas Clarkes entered as defending champions, but Dromore St Dympna's ended their title defence in the first round.

Dromore went on to win the championship after disposing of Coalisland Fianna in the final.

Team Changes
The following teams have changed division since the 2020 championship season.

To Championship
Promoted from 2020 Intermediate Championship
 Edendork St Malachy's - (Intermediate Champions)
 Eglish St Patrick's - (IFL Runners-up)

From Championship
Relegated to 2020 Intermediate Championship
 
No relegation

Preliminary round

Round 1

Quarter-finals

Semi-finals

Final

References

Tyrone Senior Football Championship
Tyrone SFC
Tyrone Senior Football Championship